Jewtown or Jew Town may refer to:

Jewtown, Baltimore, colloquial name for East Baltimore's Jewish community
Jewtown, Georgia, an unincorporated community
Jewtown, Pennsylvania, an unincorporated community
Maxwell Street in Chicago, Illinois
The historical Jewish district in Kochi, India, known for its spice market
Kensington Market in Toronto was also known as the Jewish Market or "Jew Town" as late as the 1970s
A boy band and music video created by Australian Jewish satirist John Safran for the series John Safran's Music Jamboree